Boerio is a surname. Notable people with the surname include:

Bibiana Boerio (born 1954), American businesswoman
Chuck Boerio (1930–2011), American football player
Henri Boério (born 1952), French gymnast

See also
Boeri